Buyeo Seolye (扶餘碟禮, ? – 405) was a prince of Baekje, one of the Three Kingdoms of Korea. He was the third son of the 15th king, Chimnyu of Baekje.

His older brother, Buyeo Abang, became the 17th kin, Asin of Baekje. The second brother, Hunhae was sent to Japan as a political hostage but returned to Baekje during his brother's reign. His brother, King Asin, died in 405 and Hunhae served as regent for Asin's son (who was also in Japan as a political hostage) who was returning from Japan. Seolye, who wanted to become the next king had his brother Hunhae killed but was himself killed by the returning Jeonji and the prime minister.

See also 
 Asin of Baekje
 Jeonji of Baekje
 Buyeo Hunhae
 Silla–Tang alliance
 History of Korea
 Three Kingdoms of Korea
 List of monarchs of Korea

Notes 

Year of birth missing
Baekje
Korean princes
Korean exiles
405 deaths